The Zittau Mountains Nature Park is a nature park in Germany, created in 2008.

Most of the Lusatian Mountains are in the Czech Republic, and these parts forms the Lusatian Mountains Protected Landscape Area (CHKO Lužické hory).

Protected areas
Zittau Mountains Nature Park consists of three protection zones:
Protection zone I (117 acres) includes the areas with the most valuable natural features and smaller nature parks, the Lausche and Jonsdorfer Felsenstadt.
Protection zone II (7611 acres) includes the landscape parks of Zittauer Gebirge and Mandautal.
Protection zone III (4610 acres) includes the settlement areas.

Fauna and flora
There are many protected species in the park, like arnica montana, aster alpinus, drosera rotundifolia, pedicularis palustris and many orchids. The alpine shrew and many species of owl also live there.

Gallery 
Landscapes

Scenes

See also
List of nature parks in Germany

References
Official website

External links 

Nature parks in Saxony
Protected areas established in 2008
Zittau
Görlitz (district)
Zittau Mountains